Wilson ministry may refer to:

 First Wilson Ministry (Western Australia), the state government led by Frank Wilson from 1910 to 1911
 Second Wilson Ministry (Western Australia), the state government led by Frank Wilson from 1916 to 1917

 First Wilson ministry, the British majority government led by Harold Wilson from 1964 to 1966
 Second Wilson ministry, the British majority government led by Harold Wilson from 1966 to 1970
 Third Wilson ministry, the British minority government led by Harold Wilson from March to October 1974
 Fourth Wilson ministry, the British majority government led by Harold Wilson from October 1974 to 1976

See also
 Second Shadow Cabinet of Harold Wilson